Günter Krüger (born 10 January 1953 in Pasewalk) is a German judo athlete, who competed for the SC Dynamo Hoppegarten / Sportvereinigung (SV) Dynamo. He won medals at international competitions.

References

External links
 

1953 births
German male judoka
Living people
People from Pasewalk
Sportspeople from Mecklenburg-Western Pomerania
20th-century German people